This is a list of Polish television related events from 2009.

Events
17 May - TVN Meteo weathergirl Dorota Gardias and her partner Andrej Mosejcuk win the ninth series of Taniec z Gwiazdami.
29 November - Schindler's List actress Anna Mucha and her partner Rafał Maserak win the tenth series of Taniec z Gwiazdami.
5 December - 28-year-old piano accordionist Marcin Wyrostek wins the second series of Mam talent!.

Debuts

International

Television shows

1990s
Klan (1997–present)

2000s
M jak miłość (2000–present)
Na Wspólnej (2003–present)
Pierwsza miłość (2004–present)
Dzień Dobry TVN (2005–present)
Taniec z gwiazdami (2005-2011, 2014–present)
Mam talent! (2008–present)

Ending this year

Births

Deaths

See also
2009 in Poland